WVSD (91.7 FM) is a radio station licensed to serve the community of Itta Bena, Mississippi. The station is owned by Mississippi Valley State University, and airs a variety format.

The station was assigned the WVSD call letters by the Federal Communications Commission on September 12, 1989.

References

External links
 Official Website
 FCC Public Inspection File for WVSD
 

VSD
Radio stations established in 1991
1991 establishments in Mississippi
Variety radio stations in the United States
Leflore County, Mississippi